In mathematics, particularly topology, the homeomorphism group of a topological space is the group consisting of all homeomorphisms from the space to itself with function composition as the group operation. Homeomorphism groups are very important in the theory of topological spaces and in general are examples of automorphism groups. Homeomorphism groups are topological invariants in the sense that the homeomorphism groups of homeomorphic topological spaces are isomorphic as groups.

Properties and examples
There is a natural group action of the homeomorphism group of a space on that space. The action is defined as follows:

This is a group action since for all ,

If this action is transitive, then the space is said to be homogeneous.

Topology

As with other sets of maps between topological spaces, the homeomorphism group can be given a topology, such as the compact-open topology.
In the case of regular, locally compact spaces the group multiplication is then continuous.

If the space is compact and Hausdorff, the inversion is continuous as well and  becomes a topological group.
If  is Hausdorff, locally compact  and locally connected this holds as well. 
However there are locally compact separable metric spaces for which the inversion map is not continuous and  therefore not a topological group.

In the category of topological spaces with homeomorphisms, group objects are exactly homeomorphism groups.

Mapping class group

In geometric topology especially, one considers the quotient group obtained by quotienting out by isotopy, called the mapping class group:

The MCG can also be interpreted as the 0th homotopy group, .
This yields the short exact sequence:

In some applications, particularly surfaces, the homeomorphism group is studied via this short exact sequence, and by first studying the mapping class group and group of isotopically trivial homeomorphisms, and then (at times) the extension.

See also
 Mapping class group

References

Group theory
Topology
Topological groups